Oren Williams is an American actor and is known for acting in the 2005 film Rebound.

Williams grew up in Los Angeles.

Filmography

Lincoln Heights (TV Series 2006–2009) Oren Williams as Marquis

Personal life
He is the brother of Nickelodeon actor Zachary Isaiah Williams.
He is the son of Actor, Writer and Producer Rugg Williams.

Television

External links

Oren Williams Official Site

1992 births
American male child actors
American male film actors
American male voice actors
Living people